This is a list of notable Israeli Ashkenazi Jews, including both original immigrants who obtained Israeli citizenship and their Israeli descendants.

Although traditionally the term "Ashkenazi Jews" was used as an all-encompassing term referring to the Jews descended from the Jewish communities of Europe, due to the melting pot effect of Israeli society the term "Ashkenazi Jews" gradually becomes more vague as many of the Israeli descendants of the Ashkenazi Jewish immigrants gradually adopted the characteristics of Israeli culture and as more descendants intermarry with descendants of other Jewish communities.

The list is ordered by category of human endeavor. Persons with significant contributions in two of these are listed in both of them, to facilitate easy lookup.

Politicians
 Shulamit Aloni – former minister
 Ehud Barak – prime minister (1999–01)
 Menachem Begin – prime minister (1977–83); Nobel Peace Prize (1978)
 Yossi Beilin – leader of the Meretz-Yachad party and peace negotiator
 David Ben-Gurion – first Prime Minister of Israel (1948–54, 1955–63)
 Yitzhak Ben-Zvi – first elected/second president President of Israel (1952–63)
 Gilad Erdan
 Levi Eshkol – prime minister (1963–69)
 Miriam Feirberg
 Yael German
 Teddy Kollek – former mayor of Jerusalem
 Yosef Lapid – former leader of the Shinui party
 Golda Meir – prime minister (1969–74)
 Benjamin Netanyahu – prime minister (1996–99, 2009–2021); was minister of finance; Likud party chairman
 Ehud Olmert – prime minister (2006–09); former mayor of Jerusalem
 Shimon Peres – President of Israel (2007–); prime minister (1984–86, 1995–96); Nobel Peace Prize (1994)
 Yitzhak Rabin – prime minister (1974–77, 1992–95); Nobel Peace Prize (1994) (assassinated November 1995)
 Yitzhak Shamir – prime minister (1983–84, 1986–92)
 Moshe Sharett – prime minister (1954–55)
 Ariel Sharon – prime minister (2001–06)
 Chaim Weizmann – first President of Israel (1949–52)
 Rehavam Zeevi – founder of the Moledet party (assassinated October 2001)
 Shelly Yachimovich – former leader of the opposition.

Military
 Yigal Allon – politician, a commander of the Palmach, and a general in the IDF
 Haim Bar-Lev – former Chief of General Staff of the Israel Defense Forces
 Moshe Dayan – military leader
 Giora Epstein – combat pilot, modern-day "ace of aces"
 Uziel Gal – designer of the Uzi submachine gun
 Benny Gantz – former Chief of General Staff of the Israel Defense Forces
 Wolfgang Lotz – spy
 Tzvi Malkhin – Mossad agent, captured Adolf Eichmann
 Yonatan Netanyahu – Sayeret Matkal commando, leader of Operation Entebbe
 Yitzhak Rabin – military leader and fifth Prime Minister of Israel
 Ilan Ramon – astronaut on Columbia flight STS-107
 Gilad Shalit – kidnapped soldier held in Gaza
 Yael Rom – first female to graduate from a full military flight course in the Western world; first woman to graduate from the Israeli Air Force

Religious figures

Religious-rabbis

 David Hartman
 Avraham Yitzchak Kook (1865–1935) – pre-state Ashkenazic Chief Rabbi of the Land of Israel,
 Israel Meir Lau – Ashkenazic Chief Rabbi of Israel (1993–2003), Chief Rabbi of Netanya (1978–88), (1937–)
 Aharon Lichtenstein
 Yona Metzger – Ashkenazic Chief Rabbi of Israel
 Shlomo Riskin – Ashkenazic Chief Rabbi of Efrat

Haredi rabbis

 Yaakov Aryeh Alter – Gerrer Rebbe
 Shlomo Zalman Auerbach
 Yaakov Blau
 Yisroel Moshe Dushinsky – second Dushinsky rebbe and Chief Rabbi of Jerusalem (Edah HaChareidis)
 Yosef Tzvi Dushinsky – first Dushinsky rebbe and Chief Rabbi of Jerusalem (Edah HaChareidis)
 Yosef Tzvi Dushinsky – third Dushinsky rebbe
 Yosef Sholom Eliashiv
 Issamar Ginzberg – Nadvorna-Kechnia Rebbe 
 Chaim Kanievsky
 Avraham Yeshayeh Karelitz (1878–1953) – Chazon Ish
 Nissim Karelitz – Head Justice of Rabbinical Court of Bnei Brak
 Meir Kessler – Chief Rabbi of Modi'in Illit
 Zundel Kroizer (1924–2014) – author of Ohr Hachamah
 Dov Landau – rosh yeshiva of the Slabodka yeshiva of Bnei Brak
 Yissachar Dov Rokeach – Belzer rebbe
 Yitzchok Scheiner (born 1922) – rosh yeshiva of the Kamenitz yeshiva of Jerusalem
 Elazar Menachem Shach (1899–2001) – Rav Shach
 Moshe Shmuel Shapira – rosh yeshiva of Beer Yaakov
 Dovid Shmidel – Chairman of Asra Kadisha
 Yosef Chaim Sonnenfeld – Chief Rabbi of Jerusalem (Edah HaChareidis)
 Yitzchok Tuvia Weiss – Chief Rabbi of Jerusalem (Edah HaChareidis)
 Amram Zaks (1926–2012) – rosh yeshiva of the Slabodka yeshiva of Bnei Brak
 Uri Zohar – former film director, actor, and comedian who left the entertainment world to become a rabbi

Activists

 Uri Avnery – peace activist, Gush Shalom
 Yael Dayan – writer, politician, activist
 Michael Dorfman – Russian-Israeli essayist and human rights activist
 Uzi Even – gay rights activist
 Yehuda Glick – Israeli activist and rabbi who campaigned for expanding Jewish access to the Temple Mount
 Daphni Leef – Israeli activist; in 2011 sparked one of the largest waves of mass protest in Israel's history
 Rudy Rochman – Jewish, Zionist activist
 Uri Savir – peace negotiator, Peres Center for Peace
 Israel Shahak – political activist
 Natan Sharansky – Soviet-era human rights activist

Cultural and entertainment figures

Film, TV, and stage

Popular musicians

Classical musicians

Writers

Artists

 Yaacov Agam – kinetic artist
 Yitzhak Danziger – sculptor
 Uri Fink –  comic book artist and writer
 Dudu Geva – artist and comic-strip illustrator
 Nachum Gutman – painter
 Israel Hershberg – realist painter
 Shimshon Holzman – painter

Models

 Yael Bar Zohar – model
 Michaela Bercu – model
 Nina Brosh – model
 Anat Elimelech – model and actress; murdered in 1997 by her partner
 Gal Gadot – model and actress
 Esti Ginzborg – model
 Heli Goldenberg – former model and actress
 Yael Goldman – model
 Galit Gutmann – model
 Adi Himmelbleu – model
 Mor Katzir
 Rina Mor – model
 Hilla Nachshon – model
 Bar Refaeli – model
 Shiraz Tal – model
 Pnina Rosenblum – former model

Academic figures

Physics and chemistry

 Albert Einstein – physicist; Nobel Prize winner, discoverer of the special theory of relativity
 Yakir Aharonov – physicist, Aharonov–Bohm effect and winner of the 1998 Wolf Prize in Physics
 Jacob Bekenstein – black hole thermodynamics
 David Deutsch – quantum computing pioneer; 1998 Paul Dirac Prize winner
 Richard Feynman – path integral formation, quantum theory, superfluidity; winner of 1965 Nobel Prize in Physics
 Josef Imry – physicist
 Joshua Jortner – molecular energy; 1988 winner of the Wolf Prize in Chemistry
 Aaron Katzir – physical chemistry
 Ephraim Katzir – immobilized enzymes; Japan Prize (1985) and the fourth President of Israel
 Rafi Levine – molecular energy; 1988 winner of the Wolf Prize in Chemistry
 Zvi Lipkin – physicist
 Mordehai Milgrom – modified Newtonian dynamics (MOND)
 Yuval Ne'eman – the "Eightfold way"
 Asher Peres – quantum theory
 Alexander Pines – nuclear magnetic resonance; Wolf Prize in Chemistry Laureate (1991)
 Giulio Racah – spectroscopy
 Nathan Rosen – EPR paradox
 Nathan Seiberg – string theory
 Dan Shechtman – chemist; winner of the 1999 Wolf Prize in Physics and Winner of the 2011 Nobel Prize in Chemistry for "the discovery of quasicrystals"
 Igal Talmi – particle physics
 Reshef Tenne – discovered inorganic fullerenes and non-carbon nanotubes
 Arieh Warshel – chemist, winner of the 2013 Nobel Prize in Chemistry and contributed to the development of multiscale models for complex chemical systems"
 Chaim Weizmann – acetone production

Biology and medicine

 Ruth Arnon – developed Copaxone; Wolf Prize in Medicine (1998)
 Aaron Ciechanover – ubiquitin system; Lasker Award (2000), Nobel Prize in Chemistry (2004)
 Moshe Feldenkrais – invented Feldenkrais method used in movement therapy
 Lior Gepstein – received American College of Cardiology's Zipes Award for his development of heart cells and pacemakers from stem cells
 Eyal Gur – selected by Newsweek as one of the world's top microsurgeons
 Avram Hershko – ubiquitin system; Lasker Award (2000), Nobel Prize in Chemistry (2004)
 Gavriel Iddan – inventor of capsule endoscopy
 Benjamin Kahn – marine biologist, defender of the Red Sea reef
 Yona Kosashvili – orthopedic surgeon and Chess Grandmaster
 Andy Lehrer – entomologist
 Shulamit Levenberg – inventor of a muscle tissue which isn't rejected by the body after transplant; selected by Scientific American as one of the 50 leading scientists in the world
 Alexander Levitzki – cancer research; Wolf Prize in Medicine (2005)
 Gideon Mer – malaria control
 Saul Merin – ophthalmologist, author of Inherited Eye Diseases
 Leo Sachs – blood cell research; Wolf Prize in Medicine (1980)
 Michael Sela – developed Copaxone; Wolf Prize in Medicine (1998)
 Joel Sussman – 3D structure of acetylcholinesterase, Elkeles Prize for Research in Medicine (2005)
 Meir Wilchek – affinity chromatography; Wolf Prize in Medicine (1987)
 Ada Yonath – structure of ribosome; 2009 winner of the Nobel Prize in Chemistry
 Amotz Zahavi – proposed the Handicap Principle

Social sciences

 Yehuda Bauer – historian
 Daniel Elazar – political scientist
 Haim Ginott – psychologist, child psychology
 Eliyahu Goldratt – business consultant, Theory of Constraints
 Louis Guttman – sociologist
 Elhanan Helpman – economist, international trade
 Daniel Kahneman – behavioural scientist, prospect theory; Nobel Prize in Economics (2002)
 Smadar Lavie – anthropologist
 Amihai Mazar – archaeologist
 Benjamin Mazar – archaeologist
 Eilat Mazar – archaeologist
 Benny Morris – historians, New Historians
 Erich Neumann – analytical psychologist, development, consciousness
 Nurit Peled-Elhanan – educator
 Renee Rabinowitz – psychologist and lawyer
 Anat Rafaeli – organisational behaviour researcher.
 Ariel Rubinstein – economist
 Amos Tversky – behavioral scientist, prospect theory with Daniel Kahneman
 Yigael Yadin – archaeologist

Computing and mathematics

 Ron Aharoni – mathematician, working in finite and infinite combinatorics
 Noga Alon – mathematician, computer scientist, winner of the Gödel Prize (2005)
 Shimshon Amitsur – mathematician, ring theory abstract algebra
 Robert Aumann – mathematical game theory; Nobel Prize in Economics (2005)
 Amir Ban – computer programmer; one of the main programmers of the Junior chess program
 Moshe Bar – computer programmer and creator and main developer of openMosix
 Yehoshua Bar-Hillel –  philosopher, mathematician, and linguist, best known for his pioneering work in machine translation and formal linguistics
 Joseph Bernstein – mathematician; works in algebraic geometry, representation theory, and number theory
 Eli Biham – cryptographer and cryptanalyst,  specializing in differential cryptanalysis
 Shay Bushinsky – computer programmer; one of the main programmers of the Junior chess program
 Aryeh Dvoretzky – mathematician, eighth president of the Weizmann Institute of Science
 Uriel Feige – computer scientist, winner of the Gödel Prize (2001)
 Abraham Fraenkel – mathematician, known for his contributions to axiomatic set theory and the ZF set theory
 Hillel Furstenberg – mathematician; Wolf Prize in Mathematics (2006/7)
 Shafi Goldwasser – computer scientist, winner of the Gödel Prize (1993 and 2001)
 David Harel – computer scientist; Israel Prize (2004)
 Abraham Lempel – LZW compression; IEEE Richard W. Hamming Medal (2007 and 1995)
 Elon Lindenstrauss – mathematician; known in the area of dynamics, particularly in the area of ergodic theory and its applications in number theory; Fields Medal recipient (2010)
 Joram Lindenstrauss – mathematician, known for the Johnson–Lindenstrauss lemma
 Michel Loève – probabilist
 Joel Moses – MIT provost and writer of Macsyma
 Yoram Moses – computer scientist, winner of the 2000 Gödel Prize in theoretical computer science and the 2009 Dijkstra Prize in distributed computing
 Judea Pearl – computer scientist and philosopher; known for championing the probabilistic approach to artificial intelligence and the development of Bayesian networks (see the article on belief propagation); Turing Award winner (2011)
 Ilya Piatetski-Shapiro – mathematician; representation theory; Wolf Prize in Mathematics winner (1990)
 Amir Pnueli – temporal logic; Turing Award (1996)
 Michael O. Rabin – nondeterminism, primality testing; Turing Award (1976)
 Sheizaf Rafaeli – computer scientist, scholar of computer-mediated communication
 Shmuel Safra – computer scientist, winner of the (2001) Gödel Prize
 Adi Shamir – computer scientist; RSA encryption, differential cryptanalysis; Turing Award winner (2002)
 Nir Shavit – computer scientist, winner of the (2001) Gödel Prize
 Saharon Shelah – mathematician, well known for logic; Wolf Prize in Mathematics winner (2001)
 Ehud Shapiro – computer scientist; Concurrent Prolog, DNA computing pioneer
 Moshe Y. Vardi – computer scientist; Godel Prize winner (2000)
 Avi Wigderson – mathematician, known for randomized algorithms; Nevanlinna Prize winner (1994)
 Doron Zeilberger – mathematician, known for his contributions to combinatorics
 Jacob Ziv – LZW compression; IEEE Richard W. Hamming Medal (2007 and 1995)

Engineering
 David Faiman – solar engineer and director of the National Solar Energy Center
 Liviu Librescu – Professor of Engineering Science and Mechanics at Virginia Tech; killed in the Virginia Tech massacre
 Moshe Zakai – electrical engineering
 Jacob Ziv – electrical engineering

Philosophy
 Martin Buber – philosopher
 Yeshayahu Leibowitz – philosopher
 Avishai Margalit – philosopher
 Joseph Raz – philosopher
 Gershom Scholem (1897–1982) – philosopher, historian

Humanities
 Shmuel Ben-Artzi – Bible scholar; father of psychologist Sara Netanyahu and father-in-law of Israeli Prime Minister Benjamin Netanyahu
 Noam Chomsky – linguist
 Aharon Dolgopolsky – linguist, Nostratic
 Moshe Goshen-Gottstein – Bible scholar
 Michael Oren – historian, educator, writer, and Israeli ambassador to the US>
 Hans Jakob Polotsky – linguist
 Chaim Rabin – Bible scholar
 Alice Shalvi – English literature, educator.
 Gershon Shaked – Hebrew literature
 Shemaryahu Talmon – Bible scholar
 Emanuel Tov – Bible scholar

Architecture
 Richard Kauffmann – architect
 Neri Oxman – architect

Entrepreneurs and businesspeople

Technology

 Amnon Amir – co-founder of Mirabilis (developer of ICQ)
 Moshe Bar – founder of XenSource, Qumranet
 Naftali Bennett – founder of Cyota, current Member of the Knesset and leader of The Jewish Home political party
 Safra Catz – president of Oracle
 Yair Goldfinger – co-founder of Mirabilis (developer of ICQ)
 Yossi Gross – recipient of almost 600 patents; founder of 27 medical technology companies in Israel; Chief Technology Office officer of Rainbow Medical
 Andi Gutmans – co-founder of Zend Technologies (developer of PHP)
 Daniel M. Lewin – founder of Akamai Technologies
 Bob Rosenschein – founder of Kivun Computers, Accent Software, GuruNet, Answers.com, Curiyo (Israeli-based)
 Gil Schwed – founder of Check Point
 Zeev Suraski – co-founder of Zend Technologies (developer of PHP)
 Ariki and Yossi Vardi – co-founder of Mirabilis (developer of ICQ)
 Sefi Vigiser – co-founder of Mirabilis (developer of ICQ)

Other industries
 Ted, Micky and Shari Arison – founder and owners of Carnival Corporation
 Amir Gal-Or
 Jamie Geller – celebrity chef and founder of the Kosher Media Network
 Eival Gilady
 Eli Hurvitz – head of Teva Pharmaceuticals
 Mordecai Meirowitz – inventor of the Mastermind board game
 Arnon Milchan – Hollywood film producer & founder of Regency Enterprises.
 Sammy Ofer – shipping magnate
 Yuli Ofer – real estate mogul
 Guy Oseary – talent agent, businessman, investor, and music manager; founder of Maverick Records; personal music manager of American entertainer Madonna
 Stef Wertheimer – manufacturing industrialist
 Josh Reinstein – director of the Knesset Christian Allies Caucus
 Eyal Ofer - real estate and shipping magnate
 Moris Kahn - billionaire, entrepreneur

Sports

Association football
 Eyal Berkovic – midfielder (national team), Maccabi Haifa, Southampton, West Ham United, Celtic, Manchester City, Portsmouth
 Ronnie Rosenthal – left winger/striker (national team), Maccabi Haifa, Liverpool, Tottenham, Watford
 Giora Spiegel – midfielder (national team), Maccabi Tel Aviv
 Mordechai Spiegler – Soviet Union/Israel – striker (Israel national team), manager
 Nahum Stelmach – striker (national team)
 Yochanan Vollach – defender (national team), Maccabi Haifa, Hapoel Haifa, HKFC; current president of Maccabi Haifa

Basketball

 Miki Berkovich – Maccabi Tel Aviv
 David Blu (formerly "Bluthenthal") – US and Israel, Euroleague 6' 7" forward (Maccabi Tel Aviv)
 Tal Brody – US and Israel, Euroleague 6' 2" shooting guard, Maccabi Tel Aviv
 Tal Burstein – Maccabi Tel Aviv
 Tanhum Cohen-Mintz – Latvian-born Israeli, 6' 8" center; two-time Euroleague All-Star
 Shay Doron – Israel and US, WNBA 5' 9" guard, University of Maryland (New York Liberty)
 Tamir Goodman – US and Israel, 6' 3" shooting guard
 Yotam Halperin – 6' 5" guard, drafted in 2006 NBA draft by Seattle SuperSonics (Olympiacos)
 Gal Mekel – former point guard in NBA team Dallas Mavericks
 Amit Tamir – 6' 10" center/forward, University of California, PAOK Thessaloniki (Hapoel Jerusalem)

Boxing
 Hagar Finer – WIBF bantamweight champion
 Yuri Foreman – Belarusian-born Israeli US middleweight and World Boxing Association super welterweight champion
 Roman Greenberg – International Boxing Organization's Intercontinental heavyweight champion; "The Lion from Zion"

Fencing
 Boaz Ellis – foil, five-time Israeli champion
 Lydia Hatoel-Zuckerman – foil, six-time Israeli champion
 Andre Spitzer – killed by terrorists

Figure skating

 Alexei Beletski – Ukrainian-born Israeli ice dancer, Olympian
 Galit Chait – ice dancer; World Championship bronze 2002
 Natalia Gudina – Ukrainian-born Israeli figure skater, Olympian
 Tamar Katz – US-born Israeli figure skater
 Lionel Rumi – ice dancer
 Sergei Sakhnovsky – ice dancer, World Championship bronze 2002
 Michael Shmerkin – Soviet-born Israeli figure skater
 Alexandra Zaretski – Belarusian-born Israeli; ice dancer, Olympian
 Roman Zaretski – Belarusian-born Israeli ice dancer, Olympian

Sailing

 Zefania Carmel – yachtsman, world champion (420 class)
 Gal Fridman – windsurfer (Olympic gold: 2004 (Israel's first gold medalist), bronze: 1996 (Mistral class); world champion: 2002)
 Lydia Lazarov – yachting world champion (420 class)

Swimming
 Vadim Alexeev – Kazakhstan-born Israeli swimmer, breaststroke
 Guy Barnea – swimmer who participated in the 2008 Summer Olympics
 Adi Bichman – 400-m and 800-m freestyle, 400-m medley
 Yoav Bruck – 50-m freestyle and 100-m freestyle
 Eran Groumi – 100 and 200 m backstroke, 100-m butterfly
 Judith Haspel (born "Judith Deutsch") – Austrian-born Israeli; held every Austrian women's middle- and long-distance freestyle record in 1935; refused to represent Austria at the 1936 Summer Olympics, protesting Hitler, stating, "I refuse to enter a contest in a land which so shamefully persecutes my people"
 Dan Kutler – US-born Israeli; 100-m butterfly, 4×100-m medley relay
 Keren Leibovitch – Paralympic swimmer, four-time gold medal-winner, 100-m backstroke, 50- and 100-m freestyle, 200-m individual medley
 Tal Stricker – 100- and 200-m breaststroke, 4×100-m medley relay
 Eithan Urbach – backstroke swimmer, European championship silver and bronze; 100-m backstroke

Tennis

 Noam Behr
 Ilana Berger
 Gilad Bloom
 Jonathan Erlich – 6 doubles titles, 6 doubles finals; won 2008 Australian Open Men's Doubles (w/Andy Ram), highest world doubles ranking No. 5
 Shlomo Glickstein  – highest world singles ranking No. 22, highest world doubles ranking No. 28
 Julia Glushko
 Amos Mansdorf – highest world singles ranking No. 18
 Shahar Pe'er – three WTA career titles; highest world singles ranking No. 11, highest world doubles ranking No. 21

Other
 Alex Averbukh – pole vaulter (European champion: 2002, 2006)
 Boris Gelfand – chess Grandmaster; ~2700 peak Elo rating
 Michael Kolganov – Soviet-born Israeli, sprint canoer/kayak paddler, world champion, Olympic bronze 2000 (K-1 500-meter)
 Marina Kravchenko – Ukrainian-born Israeli table tennis player, Soviet and Israeli national teams
 Sofia Polgar – Hungarian-born Israeli chess Grandmaster; sister of chess grandmasters Susan Polgar and Judith Polgar
 Ilya Smirin – chess Grandmaster; ~2700 peak Elo rating
 Emil Sutovsky – chess Grandmaster; ~2700 peak Elo rating

Criminals

 Hanan Goldblatt – actor, comedian and singer; was convicted in 2008 of perpetrating acts of rape and other sex offenses against women in his acting class
 Baruch Goldstein – massacred 29 Arabs in the Cave of the Patriarchs in 1994
 Avraham Hirschson – politician who was among other things the former Israeli Minister of Finance; convicted of stealing close to 2 million NIS from the National Workers Labor Federation while he was its chairman
 Zeev Rosenstein – mob boss and drug trafficker
 Gonen Segev – former Israeli member of Knesset and government minister; convicted for an attempt of drug smuggling, for forgery and electronic commerce fraud
 Ehud Tenenbaum – computer hacker also known as "The Analyzer" who became famous in 1998 when he was caught by the FBI after hacking into the computers of NASA, the Pentagon, the Knesset and the US Army, and after installing trojan horse software on some of those computers
 Dudu Topaz – TV personality, comedian, actor, screenwriter, playwright, author and radio and television host; committed suicide in August 2009 after being charged with inciting violence against national media figures

See also
 Israelis
 List of notable Israelis
 List of Ashkenazi Jews in central and eastern Europe
 List of Ashkenazi Jews in northern Europe
 List of Sephardic Jews in southern and western Europe
 List of Sephardic Jews in the Balkans

References

Israeli Ashkenazi
Jews,Israeli Ashkenazi
Ashkenazi
Ashkenazi